Leonardo Corbucci is a film director from Italy who is now in Los Angeles, California, U.S. and member of the DGA (Directors Guild of America). He created the TV show Cyborgs Universe and Legendary Series. He directed the International Awards Winner movie Black and White in Colors. He has won many prizes from the "Rising Star" at the Canadian International Film Festival to the "Silver Ace" at the Las Vegas International Film festival, "Best Romance" at the Best of Best Film Fest, "Best Experimental Film" at the Idie Gathering, "Best Drama" at the International Family Film Festival, "Best screenplay" at the Sunset Film Festival, "Honorable Mention" at the Queen World Film Festival, "Titoli Price" at the Murgia Film Festival, "Best Short film" at the Burbank Film Festival. His films have been official selections at the Venice Film Festival, Beverly Hills Film Festival, Santa Barbara Film Festival, San Diego IndieFest, Phoenix Film Festival, Riverside Film Festival, Seattle True Independent Film Festival, Ventura Film Festival, Rome Film Festival, Riverband Film Festival and screened at that Cannes Film Festival.

Filmography 
With Myself (US, 2021, With Myself LLC / Legendary Series)
Legendary Set Photographer (US, 2021 documentary)
COVID-19: LA to Capetown (US, 2021, Legendary Series, Amazon Prime)
Cyborgs Universe (US, 2020, Amazon Studios)
The Art of Fighting (US, 2019)
Legendary AD (US, 2018 documentary)
Brazilian jiu-jitsu Legends: Rigan Machado (US/Brazil, 2016)
One More Time (US, 2015)
An American Life (US, 2013)
Lucky in the Apocalypse (US, 2013 short)
BTN!: Buy This Now! (TV Series) - (US/UK, 2013) 
"The 3 of Us" TV Show (US, 2012)
Black & White in Colors (Usa/Bulgaria/Italy, 2012)
Leo's Dream (Usa/Italy, 2010 video)
My Church Is Better Than Yours (Usa, 2008 short)
George Lucas 0514 (Usa, 2006 short)
The Purgatory (Usa, 2006 short)
Looking for Fidel (Cuba/Italy, 2006 documentary)
Buzzy Bushy (Norway/Italy, 2004 Feature Film)
Cinecittà Story (Italy, 2002 Feature Film)
Cinecittà: Dream Factory (Italy, 2002 documentary)

References 

Year of birth missing (living people)
Living people
Italian film directors